Car SOS is a British automotive entertainment television series that airs on National Geographic Channel as well as being repeated on Channel 4 and More4. The series began in 2013 and is presented by Tim Shaw and Fuzz Townshend.

Tim and Fuzz work closely with a specialist car restoration team helping to restore owners' classic cars from across the UK and Europe, often beginning in a serious state of disrepair. The owner, unbeknownst to them, and their car are nominated by a relative or friend because the owner is unable to continue the restoration of the vehicle, due to unforeseen medical or financial reasons. The owners are then surprised with their finished car in a staged event, usually set up by Shaw.

In a special series-three episode, a 1962 Austin-Healey Sebring Sprite destined for the British Motor Museum was restored with the owner's knowledge, breaking the show's format due to the car's significance, having been driven by a racing team that included Steve McQueen, and Sir Stirling Moss, who appears in the episode.

Presenters
The series is presented by motor vehicle and engineering enthusiast Tim Shaw and musician and mechanic Fuzz Townshend. Townshend leads a team of car restoration experts who mainly work off camera, though they do have occasional cameos, most notably "Workshop" Phil Palmer's appearances within skits or scripted light-hearted moments taking place within the workshop.

Format
Each episode begins with Tim and Fuzz picking up and reviewing the featured car. Shaw will discuss why the car is being restored with the nominee's relatives, while Townshend inspects the car's state, working out the amount of work needed. The car is then winched onto a trailer and taken to Townshend's workshop, where it is inspected further by all of the restoration team. As the restoration work begins, Shaw is given a list and travels the country to find the needed parts, often portrayed in a comedic, 'blagging' manner. Shaw and Townshend will occasionally break from the restoration, leaving it in the safe hands of the team to visit other restored models of the same car, test driving them and talking with other owners. Towards the end of the restoration, Shaw invites the nominee's family to discuss setting up a fake scenario or event in which they can return the car to the owner. The staged event is also usually presented in a comedic manner, with Shaw often in disguise before revealing himself and his intentions to the owner, who is then presented with their restored car.

A special aired as the third episode of the third series featuring Sir Stirling Moss. A 1962 Sebring Austin Healey Sprite, once driven at Sebring as part of a racing team featuring Steve McQueen and Sir Stirling Moss, was restored by the team and was placed in the Heritage Motor Centre (now named the British Motor Museum) once completed. In the 1962 race, a sister car was driven by Moss to a class win, and second overall. That car had since been destroyed, leaving the team car, restored by the team, as the only Sebring Sprite left in the world.

Episodes
As of March 2023, ten full series of 10 episodes each, plus 2 special 7 Day Challenge episodes have aired, with series eleven currently airing.

Series 1 (2013)

Series 2 (2014)

Series 3 (2015)

Series 4 (2016)

Series 5 (2017)

Series 6 (2018)

7 Day Challenge Special (2019)

Series 7 (2019)

Series 8 (2020-2021)

Series 9 (2021)

Series 10 (2022)

Series 11 (2023)

References

External links
 
 
 Production website

National Geographic (American TV channel) original programming
Channel 4 original programming
2013 British television series debuts
English-language television shows
Driving in the United Kingdom
Automotive television series
Conservation and restoration of vehicles